Christopher Rothbauer (born 29 January 1998) is an Austrian swimmer. He competed in the men's 100 metre breaststroke event at the 2017 World Aquatics Championships. In April 2021, Rothbauer  qualified to represent Austria at the 2020 Summer Olympics in Tokyo, where he went on to compete in the 200 m breaststroke event, but did not advance from the preliminary round.

References

External links
 

1998 births
Living people
Place of birth missing (living people)
Austrian male breaststroke swimmers
Swimmers at the 2015 European Games
European Games competitors for Austria
Swimmers at the 2020 Summer Olympics
Olympic swimmers of Austria
21st-century Austrian people